Pinkshinyultrablast is a Russian electronic music group from Saint Petersburg, whose music is strongly influenced by the shoegazer sound.

History
The bandmembers' names are Igor (bass), Rustam (synthesizer), Sergey (drums), Roman (guitar), and Lyubov (vocals), with their band name being a reference to shoegaze band Astrobrite's 2005 album, Pinkshinyultrablast. The group's first output was a 2009 EP, Happy Songs for Happy Zombies, and several years passed before their next release, the single "Umi" in 2014. Their debut full-length, Everything Else Matters, arrived in 2015 and was marked by a variety of textures, described by The Guardian as including "shoegazing", "fiddly math-rock", and "wistful electronica". The follow-up Grandfeathered was issued in 2016. A third LP, Miserable Miracles, arrived in 2018.

Discography

Albums 
Everything Else Matters (Shelflife/Club AC30, 2015)
Grandfeathered (Shelflife/Club AC30, 2016)
Miserable Miracles (Shelflife/Club AC30, 2018)

EPs 

 Happy Songs for Happy Zombies EP (Odd Box Records, 2009)
 Songs (2020)

Singles 

 Umi (2014)
 Holy Forest (2015)
 Ravestar Supreme (2015)
 Kiddy Pool Dreams (2015)
 The Cherry Pit (2016)
 In The Hanging Gardens (2018)

See also 

 Astrobrite
 Blankenberge

References

Russian musical groups
Shoegazing musical groups